Durbhat is a village in the Ponda taluka (sub-district) of Goa.

Area, population

 the India census, Durbhat in Ponda taluka has an area of 579 hectares, a total of 771 households, a population of 3,443 (comprising 1700 males and 1,743 females) with an under-six years population of 303 (comprising 148 boys and 155 girls).  In the Indian census, its location code is 626856.

Location

Durbhat is located in the south-western part of Ponda taluka.  Quela is to the north and Borim to its south.

It lies approx 9 km from the sub-district (taluka) headquarters of Ponda town, and approx 33 km away from the district North Goa headquarters of Panaji or Panjim via NH748.

Local jurisdiction

Durbhat lies under the Durbhat gram panchayat.  Its location code in the Indian census is 626856.

References

Villages in North Goa district